, whose Chinese name was Chao Heng (pronounced Chōkō in Japanese), was a Japanese scholar and waka poet of the Nara period. He served on a Japanese envoy to Tang China and later became the Tang duhu (protectorate governor) of Annan (modern Vietnam).

Early life 
As a young man he was admired for having outstanding academic skills.

Career 

In 717–718, he was part of the Japanese mission to Tang China (Kentōshi) along with Kibi no Makibi and Genbō.  They returned to Japan; he did not.

In China, he passed the civil-service examination. Around 725, he took an administrative position and was promoted in Luoyang in 728 and 731. Around 733 he received , who would command the Japanese diplomatic mission. In 734, he tried to return to Japan but the ship to take him back sank not long into the journey, forcing him to remain in China for several more years. In 752, he tried again to return, with the mission to China led by Fujiwara no Kiyokawa, but the ship he was traveling in was wrecked and ran aground off the coast of Annan (modern day northern Vietnam), but he managed to return to Chang'an in 755.

When the An Lushan Rebellion started later that year, it was unsafe to return to Japan and Nakamaro abandoned his hopes of returning to his homeland. He took several government offices and rose to the position of Duhu (Governor-protector) of Annam between 761 and 767, residing in Hanoi. He then returned to Chang'an and was planning his return to Japan when he died in 770 at age 72.

He was a close friend of the Chinese poets Li Bai and Wang Wei, Zhao Hua, Bao Xin, and Chu Guangxi.

Legacy 

From his literary work he is most famous for a poem filled with intense longing for his home in Nara. One of his poems was included in the anthology Hyakunin Isshu:

Abe's place in Japanese cultural history is confirmed in Hokusai's Hyakunin Isshu series of ukiyo-e woodblock prints.

See also 
 Japanese missions to Imperial China
 Japanese missions to Tang China

References

Bibliography

External links 

698 births
770 deaths
People of Nara-period Japan
Japanese male poets
7th-century Japanese poets
Tang dynasty jiedushi
Hyakunin Isshu poets
Japanese emigrants to China
Japan–Vietnam relations
Japanese ambassadors to the Tang dynasty